Valentia Young Islanders  are a Gaelic Athletic Association club from Valentia Island, South County Kerry, Ireland. They play in Division 4 of the county league and in the Kerry Novice Football Championship.    The club's most recent success has been winning the Munster Junior football championship final after beating Kildimo-Pallaskenry 12 points to 1-8 on 25 January 2015.

The Young Islanders is one of the many clubs affected by mass emigration, losing numerous players in this manner. In recent years the club has struggled to field a sufficient number of players and has at times explored the option of merging with other local clubs.

Achievements
 Munster Junior B Football Champions 2015
 Kerry Intermediate Football Championship Winners 1986, 1995
 Kerry Club Football Championship Winners 1986
 Kerry Junior Football Championship Winners 1981
 Kerry Novice Football Championship Winners 1975, 2014
 South Kerry Senior Football Championship Winners 1939, 1945, 1950, 1957, 1958, 1959, 1961, 1962, 1964, 1979, 1981, 1982, 1983, 1986, 1987, 1988, 1990, 1993, 2000, 2005

Notable players
 Ger Lynch
 Mick O'Connell

External links

Gaelic games clubs in County Kerry
Gaelic football clubs in County Kerry